Tomasz is a Polish given name, the equivalent of Thomas in English.

Notable people with the given name include:
Tomasz Adamek (born 1976), Polish heavyweight boxer
Tomasz Arciszewski (1877–1955), Polish socialist politician and Prime Minister of the Polish government-in-exile in London (1944–1947) 
Tomasz Bajerski (born 1975), Polish motorcycle speedway rider who won the Team Polish Champion title in 2001
Tomasz Bednarek (born 1981), Polish tennis player
Tomasz Beksiński (1958–1999), Polish radio presenter, music journalist and movie translator
Tomasz Chrzanowski (born 1980), Polish motorcycle speedway rider who has been a member of the Poland national team
Tomasz Fornal (born 1997), Polish volleyball player, member of Poland men's national volleyball team and silver medallist at the 2022 World Championships
Tomasz Frankowski (born 1974), Polish footballer (senior career from 1991)
Tomasz Gapiński (born 1982), Polish international motorcycle speedway rider who has won Team Polish Champion titles in 1999 and 2006
Tomasz Gollob (born 1971), Polish motorcycle speedway rider who has appeared in every Speedway Grand Prix series since the inaugural 1995 season
Tomasz Górski (canoeist), Polish sprint canoer who won a bronze medal in the K-2 1000 m event at the 2006 Szeged World Championships
Tomasz Górski (politician) (born 1973), Polish politician
Tomasz Jędrzejak (born 1979), Polish motorcycle speedway rider who is a member of Poland national speedway team
Tomasz Kasprzik (born 1993), Polish footballer (senior career from 2009)
Tomasz Kot (born 1977), Polish actor
Tomasz Kozłowski (born 1958), Polish diplomat
Tomasz Kuszczak (born 1982), Polish footballer (senior career from 2000)
Tomasz Lipiec (born 1971), Polish race walker and former Minister of Sport
Tomasz Majewski (born 1981), Polish Olympic gold medalist in the shot put event
Tomasz Narkun, Polish mixed martial arts fighter
Tomasz Radziński (born 1973), Polish Canadian footballer (senior career from 1990)
Tomasz Schafernaker (born 1979), Polish-British meteorologist.
Tomasz Sikora (born 1973), Polish Winter Olympics silver medallist and World and European Championship gold medallist in the biathlon
Tomasz Skublak (born 1997), Canadian soccer player
Tomasz Stańko (1942–2018), Polish musician and composer
Tomasz Strzembosz (1930–2004), Polish historian and writer who specialized in the history of Poland during World War II
Tomasz Wicherkiewicz (born 1967), Polish linguist
Tomasz Wiktorowski (born 1981), Polish tennis coach
Tomasz Wylenzek (born 1983), Polish-born German Olympic and World Champion gold medallist in sprint canoe events

Polish masculine given names